Pachytrechodes is a genus of beetles in the family Carabidae, containing the following species:

 Pachytrechodes basilewskyi Jeannel, 1960
Pachytrechodes brevis Belousov & Nyundo, 2013
 Pachytrechodes leleupi Uéno, 1987
 Pachytrechodes uncinatus Uéno, 1987

References

Trechinae